The March of Carinthia was a frontier district (march) of the Carolingian Empire created in 889. Before it was a march, it had been a principality or duchy ruled by native-born Slavic (or semi-Slavic) princes at first independently and then under Bavarian and subsequently Frankish suzerainty. The realm was divided into counties which, after the succession of the Carinthian duke to the East Frankish throne, were united in the hands of a single authority. When the march of Carinthia was raised into a Duchy in 976, a new Carinthian march (that is, a march defending the Carinthian duchy) was created. It became the later March of Styria.

Background
In 745, Carantania, an independent Slavic principality, with the growth of the Avar threat, submitted to Odilo of Bavaria, himself a vassal of the Franks. With this, the Bavarian frontier was extended and Odilo's son, Tassilo III, began the Christianisation of the Slavic tribes beyond the Enns. In 788, Charlemagne fully integrated the territory of Carinthia (Carantania) into the Frankish Empire by making it a part of the extended Duchy of Friuli, along with the March of Istria. Under him, missionary work increased, especially through the Archdiocese of Salzburg. 

Between 819 and 823, the native Slavic population supported Ljudevit Posavski in revolt against Frankish overlordship. In 827, the Bulgars attacked Carinthia and, in 828, Louis the Pious reorganised Friuli into four counties, the two northernmost of which — Carinthia and Lower Pannonia — were detached from the Italian kingdom and incorporated into Bavaria. Louis, King of Bavaria, reorganised Carinthia into Frankish counties soon after. The division of Carinthia may have occurred as early as before 819 or perhaps simultaneously with division of Friuli. Before this, the Carinthians were still ruled by native dukes. The new comital administration was mixed Bavarian-Slavic.

Carloman and Arnulf
The territory remained within the Bavarian kingdom of Louis. In 855, Radbod, Prefect of the Ostmark was deposed for unfaithfulness and Rastislav of Moravia rebelled against East Frankish suzerainty. In place of Radbod, Louis appointed his eldest son Carloman (856). Carloman took control of the other eastern marches, Carinthia and Pannonia, and in 858 campaigned heavily against Rastislav, forcing him to come to terms. In 861, Pabo, margrave of Carinthia, rebelled with his counts and Carloman replaced him with Gundachar. In 863, Louis, fearing a filial rebellion, invaded Carinthia, Carloman's home base. Gundachar went over to the king with a large army he had been given to command the defence of the Schwarza. Consequently, Carloman was captured and deprived of his prefecture, which was bestowed on Gundachar. 

When Carloman reconciled with his father and was created King of Bavaria, he granted Carinthia to his son by a Carinthian concubine, Arnulf. Arnulf kept his seat at Moosburg (Mosapurc) and the Carinthians treated him as their native duke. After Carloman was incapacitated by a stroke in 879, Louis the Younger inherited Bavaria and confirmed Arnulf in Carinthia by an agreement with Carloman. Bavaria, however, was ruled more or less by Arnulf. Arnulf had ruled Bavaria during the summer and autumn of 879 while his father arranged his succession and he himself was granted "Pannonia," in the words of the Annales Fuldenses, or "Carantanum," in the words of Regino of Prüm.

March
After he in turn became King of all East Francia, Arnulf created a march of Carinthia. Alongside it were the marches of Istria, Austria, and Carniola. The southernmost marches, Carinthia and Carniola, were especially susceptible to Magyar raids. In 901, just two years after their first contact with western Europe, Carinthia was ravaged by the Magyars. In 952, Carinthia was placed under the Duchy of Bavaria, as were Carniola, Istria, and Friuli. 

The march's major cities were Friesach and Villach. In the tenth century, a so-called Carantanian march (called the "march of Carinthia" because it was the march [i.e. frontier district] of the Bavarian duchy and later under the Carinthian duchy) broke off from Carinthia. The Carantanian march was later to become the Duchy of Styria. The only known Carinthian margrave from this period — though many counts are known — is Markward III, who was a preses de Carinthia.

In 976, the Emperor Otto II made his nephew Otto I Duke of Bavaria and separated the Carinthian march and the other marches from the duchy. He made Carinthia a duchy for the Liutpoldinger Henry, who acted as a sort of "chief of the border police," controlling Istria, Friuli, and Carniola.

Notes

Sources

Reuter, Timothy (trans.) The Annals of Fulda [AF]. (Manchester Medieval series, Ninth-Century Histories, Volume II.) Manchester: Manchester University Press, 1992.
Reuter, Timothy. Germany in the Early Middle Ages 800–1056. New York: Longman, 1991.
MacLean, Simon. Kingship and Politics in the Late Ninth Century: Charles the Fat and the end of the Carolingian Empire. Cambridge University Press: 2003.

976 disestablishments
Carinthia
States and territories established in the 880s
Medieval Slovenia
Medieval Austria
Carolingian marches
889 establishments
States and territories established in the 970s

ca:Marca de Carintia
de:Karantanien